Mouad Hadded (born 22 February 1997) is an Algerian professional footballer who plays as a defender for CR Belouizdad and the Algerian national football team.

Career 
In 2020, he signed a contract with MC Alger.
In 2022, he signed a contract with CR Belouizdad.

References

External links 
 
 

MC Alger players
1997 births
Algerian footballers
Algeria international footballers
Association football defenders
Living people